UK basketball may refer to:
 Kentucky Wildcats men's basketball, at the University of Kentucky
 British Basketball League, in the United Kingdom